Raphaël Lakafia (born 28 October 1988) is a French rugby union player. He is the younger brother of Pierre-Gilles Lakafia and son of former French javelin champion Jean-Paul Lakafia.

Lakafia played for France in the 2008 IRB Junior World Championship and scored three tries against Japan. He played at the 2011 Rugby World Cup for France. He played twice during the tournament against Japan and Tonga.

References

External links
Rugbyrama.fr Profile

1988 births
Living people
FC Grenoble players
Biarritz Olympique players
Stade Français players
French rugby union players
Rugby union number eights
Rugby union players from Wallis and Futuna
French people of Wallis and Futuna descent
France international rugby union players
RC Toulonnais players
French people of New Caledonian descent